The Co-Cathedral of Saint-Antoine-de-Padoue is a co-cathedral in Longueuil, Quebec, Canada, on Montreal's south shore. It is located on the corner of Rue Saint-Charles and Chemin Chambly in the Borough of Le Vieux-Longueuil. It is dedicated to St. Anthony of Padua. The cathedral houses the remains of the Blessed Marie-Rose Durocher, the foundress of the Sisters of the Holy Names of Jesus and Mary.

Its episcopal region is Longueuil-Nord. Lionel Gendron, the bishop, has a cathedra sculpted in walnut. Before the reign of Bernard Hubert, it was simply a parish church.

The cathedral was classified as historical monument by the Government of Quebec in 1984.

History

The site contains the archaeological remains of Fort Longueuil, a fort constructed between 1685 and 1690 as the fortified residence of Charles le Moyne de Longueuil, the only Canadian-born person to be raised to the rank of Baron by the French King.  The fort was demolished in 1810 and the cathedral contains stone building materials and elements salvaged from the fort. The site of the fort was designated a National Historic Site of Canada in 1923.

The Parish of  Saint-Antoine-de-Padoue was founded in 1698, and is one of the oldest in Canada. The present cathedral building was largely built from 1884 to 1887, although it was not completed until 1911. It is the third church in the history of Longueuil, the first being completed in 1811.

Saint-Antoine-de-Padoue was designated as a co-cathedral in 1982 when the Roman Catholic Diocese of Saint-Jean-de-Québec was renamed the Roman Catholic Diocese of Saint-Jean-Longueuil. The Cathedral of Saint-Jean-l'Évangéliste has been the primary cathedral of the diocese since its establishment in 1933.

A funeral was held for Jean-Pierre Côté, the 23rd Lieutenant Governor of Quebec, on July 17, 2002.

In 2005, that the faithful of the diocese paid tribute to Pope John Paul II, following his death. They also wished a happy pontificate to his successor, Pope Benedict XVI, during a special vigil attended by the bishop as well as a local congregation of Filipino Religious Sisters.

Architecture

The cathedral was constructed in the  Gothic revival style of architecture, while the dome is an example of Byzantine Revival architecture.

The architects Henri-Maurice Perrault and Albert Mesnard wanted the cathedral to be of great volume. The same architects built the church's altar, combining  fine stones with the hardest stone. The Québécois sculptor, Louis-Philippe Hébert, contributed to the cathedral's facade, by creating three sculptures out of wood, covered in metal. The church was constructed at a cost of $98,895 by Eugène Fournier dit Préfontaine, an entrepreneur, farmer and carpenter.

Louis Jobin renovated the church in 1930. The roof, which had been covered in steel, was restored in 1999 using  of copper. Further restoration work is planned.

Functions 
Mass is ordinarily celebrated twice Monday to Friday, once Saturday, and four times Sunday. The Confessionals are normally ready fifteen minutes before mass. Around one third of the cathedral is full for weekend services, while it is less than one sixth full during the week. There are approximately 9,400 Roman Catholics in the parish. The churchwardens regularly organize fundraising campaigns to proceed with renovations to the cathedral as well as for the parish's rectory.

Part of the cathedral's crypt holds the graves of the Le Moyne and Grant families, affiliated with the title of Baron de Longueuil.

Priests
Inside the cathedral, there is a plaque listing all the priests in the parish's history.

References

External links

Official website of the parish 
Website of Vigilia Saint Antoine 
Cocathédrale Saint-Antoine-de-Padoue. La recherche d'une volumétrie expressive par Denyse Légaré (publié sur le site du Conseil du patrimoine religieux du Québec 
Comment on a restauré la toiture 
L'art sacré dans la cocathédrale -- Site de la société historique du Marigot  

Buildings and structures in Longueuil
Saint Antoine
Gothic Revival church buildings in Canada
Roman Catholic churches completed in 1911
Heritage buildings of Quebec
Churches in Montérégie
20th-century Roman Catholic church buildings in Canada